Ajay is a 1996 Hindi language romantic action drama film, produced and directed by Suneel Darshan and starring Sunny Deol, Karisma Kapoor, Reena Roy, Suresh Oberoi and Kiran Kumar. Other cast includes Sadashiv Amrapurkar,  Mohnish Bahl, Sharat Saxena, Farida Jalal, Laxmikant Berde and others.

It was declared "average" at the box office.

Plot
Raja Brijraj Singh and his younger brother Raja Ranbir Singh lives in a spacious palace and are wealthy landlords of a small Indian town named as Kishengarh. They would like their only, head-strong and foreign returned niece Manorama (Karisma Kapoor) to marry equally wealthy Rupesh Singh but she gives her heart to a poor poultry dealer named Ajay (Sunny Deol). When Brijraj and Ranbir learn of this relationship they put a strong objection to this and will do anything in their power even kill to prevent their niece from getting married to Ajay.They threaten her and she has to give false witness that puts Ajay behind bars and has his sister's in-laws disown her, all this leads to their mother's demise. Ajay blames it all on Manorama but later learns the truth and eventually takes revenge by killing her uncles.

Cast
 Sunny Deol as Ajay 
 Karishma Kapoor as Manorama "Rama"
 Reena Roy as Durga
 Devayani as Anjali
 Suresh Oberoi as Raja Brijraj Singh 
 Kiran Kumar as Chote Raja Ranbir 
 Farida Jalal as Ajay's Mother
 Sharat Saxena as Inspector Tippen Singh 
 Mohnish Behl as Roopesh Singh 
 Laxmikant Berde as Rupaiya 
 Sadashiv Amrapurkar as Lala
 Dan Dhanoa as Roopesh's Friend
 Dolly Bindra as Manorama Friend

Soundtrack
The Music is scored by Anand–Milind. The song Chamak Chhallo & Chand Sa Chehra were popular. Singers Kumar Sanu, Alka Yagnik, Udit Narayan,  Sapna Awasthi & Jolly Mukherjee lent their voice.

References

External links 
 

1996 films
1990s Hindi-language films
Films scored by Anand–Milind
Indian action films
1990s masala films
Films directed by Suneel Darshan
1996 action films
Hindi-language action films
Indian romantic action films